Messelornis, also known as the Messel rail, is an extinct genus of gruiform bird, closely related to modern rails. It is the most abundant bird from the Messel Lagerstätte, representing roughly half of all Messel bird fossils with more than 500 specimens known. The fossil record are from the Paleocene to the early Eocene.

Messelornis was a generalized terrestrial bird, with a short beak, long legs, and a long tail. It was probably not an especially adept flier. It was omnivorous and had a diet including seeds, fruits, and fish. The name of the type species, M. cristata, refers to the fact that it was initially interpreted as having a comb-like crest, but the existence of this crest has been disputed. One of its feathers had an iridescent coloration, but no chemical analysis has been done yet.

Messelornis was originally interpreted as closely related to the sunbittern, which was also classified as a member of the Gruiformes at the time. However, the sunbittern has since been classified in a separate order, Eurypygiformes, while Messelornis has remained a member of the Gruiformes and is now interpreted as a relative of rails.

References

Eocene life
Messelornithidae
Prehistoric birds of Europe